Thierbach Power Station was a brown coal-fired power station in the Leipzig Bay at Espenhain-Thierbach, Germany. It had a 300-metre-tall chimney, which belonged to the tallest free-standing structures of the former GDR (Eastern Germany).

External links

 https://maps.google.com/maps?t=h&ie=UTF8&z=15&ll=51.165163,12.502055&spn=0.011518,0.028925&om=1

Coal-fired power stations in Germany
Towers in Germany
Buildings and structures in Saxony